Andon is a commune in the Alpes-Maritimes department in the Provence-Alpes-Côte d'Azur region of southeastern France.

The inhabitants of the commune are known as Andonnais or Andonnaises

Geography
Andon is a small village in the Alpes-Maritimes located about 50 kilometres north-west of Cannes and 30 kilometres south-east of Castellane. Andon is a second home for many coastal residents and for people attracted by the peace and beauty of the area and a winter village surrounded by small ski resorts.

Due to its proximity to the Côte d'Azur and the quietness of the mountains, Andon is a hub for tourists, regular or not, each in search of calm for a few days or hours and is also a haven of peace for artists.

The ski resort of Audibergue is in Andon commune. The Loup has its source nearby.

The village is accessible via the D79 which branches west from the D5 road passing through the village and continuing west to Caille.  The D2 road also passes through the north of the commune from Valderoure in the west to Greolieres in the east. The No. 400 route of the Sillages Transport Association (Valderoure-Saint-Vallier) serves the town from Monday to Friday on request and No. 410 route (Valderoure-Villaute) and No. 411 route (Saint-Auban-Villaute) from Monday to Saturday also on request.

Neighbouring communes and villages

Climate
The climate of the region is Alpine with Mediterranean influences. Winters are cold (-4 °C to 6 °C) with warm summers (22 °C in the afternoon) and sunny with cool nights (8 to 10 °C). The rest of the year is rather cool with frosts possible from October to May.

History
The commune of Andon incorporates territory from three areas with Thorenc and Haut-Thorenc, Thorenc-Station, and Bas-Thorenc in the north, the hamlet of Canauxin in the east, and the ski resort of Audibergue in the south.

Andon
The site of Andon village has been occupied since 1000 BC. There are traces of the presence of Ligures in an entrenched camp called Castellaras de la Selle d'Andon. This site was later occupied by the Romans. Milestones have been found indicating the Via Vintiana connecting Séranon to Gréolières with the names of the Emperor Marcus Aurelius and the procurator Julius Honoratus.

There are traces of Roman presence at multiple sites in the commune at: la Selle de Caille, la ferme du château, la Moulière, les Teilles, la Selle d'Andon, la Baisse, la Haute-Valette. At Collet de la Serre in the castellaras a small necropolis was found. The ruins of a large Roman tomb have been identified near the priory of Clos de Bourges.

The village of Andon succeeded a former village which was perched on the Col de Castellaras and whose remains date to the 13th century. It was abandoned after a fire in the 18th century. The village was then rebuilt at the current location.

The Count of Provence gave the lordship of Andon to Romée de Villeneuve in 1230. The lordship then passed to the family of Grasse-Bar, then to Russan then Théas. On the eve of the Revolution it belonged, with Thorenc, to Mr. de Fanton, a Lieutenant-General at the Grasse headquarters.

The death of Queen Joanna I of Naples created a crisis of succession for the head of the County of Provence. The cities of the Union of Aix (1382-1387) supported Charles of Duras against Louis I of Anjou. The Lord of Andon, Florent de Castellane, endorsed the Angevins in 1385 after the death of Louis I.

Canaux
Canaux appears in texts in 1251.

In 1421, the Countess of Provence gave this lordship to Bertrand de Grasse. The original village was located 1 km to the west.

In 1623, the Bishop of Grasse dared not climb to Canaux "as we are assured that the road is rough and bad". His successors were equally cautious.

Thorenc
Thorenc is mentioned in texts from 1200 under the name castrum de Torenc or Torenc. The village was originally a lordship of Grasse, then of Boniface de Castellane before depending the Count of Provence in 1235 who passed it to Romée de Villeneuve. The Lords of Thorenc only resided in the castle of the Four Towers a few months per year.

From 1348 village life was disturbed by the arrival of the Black Death that decimated the population and then by the war between the Angevins and Duras for the succession of the County of Provence. In 1384 and between January and October 1385, a gang leader called Vita de Blois was present at Thorenc who seized the lordship on behalf of the Count of Savoy. The text of the Truce of Nice of 3 November 1388, stated that Vita de Blois entered the service of Amédée VII with 25 spears and undertakes not to attack until the following May the Duchess of Anjou and her supporters from his castrum de Thorenc. There were still the ravages of the plague in the 15th century that drove people to leave the village.

In 1542 a branch of Villeneuve-Thorenc appeared with Claude I. His descendants were also lords of Saint-Jeannet and governors of Saint-Paul-de-Vence. Claude I of Villeneuve-Thorenc sold, in 1539, the Castle of the Four Towers to Rascas, Lord of Muy. He built a new castle in Haut-Thorenc. Antoine de Russan, who was called Virnasse Lord of Thorenc, of Malle, and of Pignans, would have bought the Lordship of Thorenc from Rascas of Muy around 1515. The Rascas family had sufficient money to follow François I to war. They held Thorenc from Charles of Anjou (after it having belonged to the Templars.) It was he who strengthened and renovated the castle. The castle then belonged to Raymond of Eoulx, Puget de Clermont, Calvy, Saint-André, then to the Count of Estang-Parade.

Towards 1515, the Russan family originally from Grasse (Simosse said of Russan that they were converted Jewish merchants the 3rd richest in the city in the 15th century who certainly came from Russan near Nîmes) were co-lords of Thorenc and owned land in Bas-Thorenc. An Act of 26 August 1520 recorded the sharing agreement of Thorenc land between Antoine de Villeneuve (of Haut-Thorenc) and Antoine de Russan (of Lower Thorenc). In 1640 at the wedding of Honorade de Russan, the Russans were still lords of Thorenc. In 1624, Antoine III de Russan, Squire of Thorenc, married his daughter Gasparde "acted, done and published audit at Thorenc and in the room of the house and castle of the Squire of Thorenc". (There may be some scepticism about the sale of the Castle of the Four Towers to Villeneuve in 1560 since it was in the Russan family from 1515 to at least 1624).

Antoine de Grasse inherited the Russan land and formed the line of Grasse-Thorenc with a share of the land of Bas-Thorenc with the other part belonging to Grasse-Saint-Cézaire. The fief of Grasse-Thorenc was purchased by the Lombards of Amirat in 1632. It was sold in 1708 to Paul de Théas, Lord of Caille. The marriage in 1746 of Anne-Marie, sister of François de Théas-Thorenc, to Albert de Durand de Sartoux brought the Castle of Barraque into the Durand de Sartoux family.

The Castle of the Four Towers was sold in 1560 by Rescas, Lord of Muy to Villeneuve-Mons and it then passed into the Villeneuve-Bargemon family. In the middle of the 18th century their heirs sold this part of the fief to Claude de Fanton, Lord of Andon and king's counsel in the Seneschal of Grasse.

After the Revolution, the territory of Thorenc became part of the commune of Andon.

The hygienism of the 19th century (based on the findings of Louis Pasteur) created the fashion of staying in Thorenc as a climate station using therapy for hygiene. The sanatorium of the clergy of France was built on the site of the castle of the abbots of Lérins.

Heraldry

Administration

List of Successive Mayors

Partial municipal elections took place in 2002 following the revocation of Adrien Prato by judicial decision, leading to the election of Michèle Olivier.

Population

Sites and Monuments

The Church was of medieval origin but completely rebuilt in 1820. It contains a Stoup (12th century) which is registered as an historical object.
The ruins of the Chapel of Saint-Hilaire, abandoned after the War of the Austrian Succession in 1746
The oppidum of Font-Freye at 1211 m
The Selle d'Andon where there was a priory dependent on the Abbey of Lérins. The site was occupied by the Romans. There is a Roman cemetery next to the chapel
The Oratory of Saint Antoine, a former place of pilgrimage
Audibergue Mountain with a peak at 1642 m. A ski resort was created there in 1960
The Chasms of Audibergue
The hamlet of Canaux with the ruins of the old village abandoned in the 14th century, the 5 Celtic-Ligurian camps, the Pitches of the Moulière Valley
The Castellaras de Thorenc (Middle Ages) is a remnant of the medieval village with its castle and ramparts dating from the 12th and 14th centuries. The city was at the fork of an east-west Roman road and the medieval road from Grasse to Castellane
The  Château des Quatre-Tours (Chateau of Four Towers) is a fortified manor house built in the 15th century at Thorenc-Station

See also
Communes of the Alpes-Maritimes department

References

External links
Andon Official website 
Andon on the National Geographic Institute website 
Andon on Géoportail, National Geographic Institute (IGN) website 
Andon on the 1750 Cassini Map
 Andon association

Communes of Alpes-Maritimes